The 2004 Amstel Gold Race was the 39th edition of the annual road bicycle race "Amstel Gold Race", held on Sunday April 18, 2004 in the Limburg province, The Netherlands. The race stretched 251.1 kilometres, with the start in Maastricht and the finish in Valkenburg. There were a total of 191 competitors, with 101 riders completing the race.

Result

External links
Results

Amstel Gold Race
Amstel Gold Race
2004 in Dutch sport
2004 in road cycling
April 2004 sports events in Europe